Michael Shane  (May 4, 1927 — February 22, 1994) was an American lawyer and actor.  Born in Cleveland, Ohio, he attended Glenville High School.  While earning his undergraduate and law degrees at Ohio State University, he performed as a stand-up comic at local nightclubs.

Legal work

Shane became a lawyer in 1953 and was a member of the Shane, Shane & Henderson Law Firm in downtown Cleveland.  Specializing in personal injury and malpractice cases, he had a reputation as a dramatic courtroom lawyer who made emotional presentations to juries.  He also did legal work in show business, acted in small theatre productions and wrote songs.

Acting

In 1963, director Larry Peerce was filming a small independent movie, One Potato, Two Potato in nearby Painesville, Ohio, and needed a legal office for one of the scenes.  Shane offered his in exchange for a part in the film.  His performance as attorney Jordan Hollis in the film earned him a positive review in The New Yorker magazine.

Filmography

 One Potato, Two Potato (1964) - Jordan Hollis
 Why Would I Lie? (1980) - Bartender
 Love Child (1982) - Judge Hare
 Take These Men (1983) (TV) - the Hotel Manager ... aka Surprise, Surprise! (USA: alternative title)
 Casino (1992) (TV) - Tony Sutton (final film role)

References

External links

1927 births
1994 deaths
20th-century American lawyers
20th-century American male actors
American male film actors
American male television actors
Glenville High School alumni
Male actors from Cleveland
Ohio State University Moritz College of Law alumni